Luchnovsky is a rural locality (a khutor) in Dubovskoye Rural Settlement, Uryupinsky District, Volgograd Oblast, Russia. The population was 131 in 2010. There are four streets.

Geography 
Buratsky is the nearest rural locality.

References 

Rural localities in Uryupinsky District